William Arthur Holdaway (18 March 1893 – 23 August 1967) was a New Zealand cricketer who played for Otago. He was born and died in Dunedin.

Holdaway made a single first-class appearance for the team, during the 1918–19 season, against Southland. From the lower-middle order, he scored 9 runs in the first innings in which he batted, and a duck in the second.

See also
 List of Otago representative cricketers

External links
William Holdaway at Cricket Archive

1893 births
1967 deaths
New Zealand cricketers
Otago cricketers